This article shows the notable future developments in Singapore. Majority of them are currently under construction with most to be completed within the next five years.

Commercial

Central Boulevard Towers 
Scheduled to be completed by 2023, the 99-year leasehold white site at the junction of Central Boulevard and Raffles Quay named Central Boulevard Towers offers premium Grade A office space. The development consists of two office towers (16-storey and 48-storey) above a 7-storey retail podium block and buoyed by an interstitial green landscaped public space. A sky garden on the 7th floor offers a dedicated jogging track and viewing decks, as well as a restaurant.

The project will be directly connected underground to the adjacent Downtown MRT station on the Downtown line, with link bridges to the East West line and North South line at Raffles Place station and the upcoming Shenton Way station on the Thomson-East Coast line.

Guoco Midtown and Midtown II
Guoco Midtown, a mixed-use development by GuocoLand is currently under construction. Located in the Beach Road area, the S$2.4 billion development will contain a 30-storey office block with flexible spaces, a 33-storey 219-unit residential block named Midtown Bay, and public spaces. It will also be integrated with the conserved Beach Road Police Station, to be fitted with shops. The development will be completed by the second half of 2023.

In addition, with the successful purchase of the site at Tan Quee Lan Street which is located directly above Bugis MRT station and across the Guoco Midtown site, two 30-storey residential towers with more than 500 residential units as well as a public retail podium will be built by GuocoLand. The development will be integrated with the adjacent larger Guoco Midtown and bring about greater connectivity in the area. This land acquisition will result in the combined site area to be 50% more than the existing Guoco Midtown, and is set to become one of the largest developments in the Central Business District (CBD). The project is named Guoco Midtown II, with the residential component named Midtown Modern.

Both developments will be connected underground with the entire development having an extensive pedestrian network to Bugis MRT station as well as the City Hall, Bugis, and Marina Centre districts.

Perennial Business City (Former Big Box) 
Announced on 4 December 2020, the existing Big Box shopping mall situated in Jurong East has been acquired by Perennial Real Estate for redevelopment. The zoning of the site has been changed to a business park where the former commercial warehouse space, Big Box, will be redeveloped into Perennial Business City. It is expected to be completed in phases, beginning from the fourth quarter of 2021.

Greater Southern Waterfront
Plans for a southern waterfront city were briefly announced in 2013 as part of a plan to consolidate port activities in Tuas. These plans were elaborated as a Greater Southern Waterfront in 2019, a 2,000ha area with 30 km of coastline from Marina Bay to Pasir Panjang. They include the redevelopment of Keppel Club with 9,000 HDB and private homes. and more office spaces near homes bringing about new ways of living. Links to other nature areas will also be created to places like West Coast Park and East Coast Park, Rail Corridor and Sentosa. In addition, new attractions like the redevelopment of Pasir Panjang power plants, a proposed "Downtown South" resort by NTUC on Pulau Brani to thank workers, revitalisation of Sentosa's beaches, nature and heritage areas on the island too.

Pasir Panjang Power District 
Housing two decommissioned power plants, oil and gas tanks, and ancillary buildings, the  Pasir Panjang Power District, located next to the Labrador Nature Reserve, will be redeveloped as part of the Greater Southern Waterfront transformation plans. Some of the proposed ideas include a pair of towers built from old shipping containers, residences, hotels, events venue, gallery space, public park with courtyards, rooftop farms, and a theme park.

The district will be released for redevelopment through a tender in 2021.

Jurong Lake District (JLD)

A new draft masterplan for Jurong Lake District was unveiled on 25 August 2017, with new developments in the Lakeside district. It will include a commercial centre around the High Speed Rail station in Jurong East, as well as a third island crested through a new canal. It would be completed in two decades time.

The Woodleigh Residences and The Woodleigh Mall
A new mixed-use development in Bidadari comprising The Woodleigh Residences and The Woodleigh Mall is currently under construction. Being developed by Singapore Press Holdings and Kajima, it will have 680 units and 28,000 square metres of retail gross floor area. The development will also include a  Community Club and a  Neighbourhood Police Centre. It will also be connected underground to Woodleigh MRT station and Singapore's second air-conditioned underground bus interchange located at adjacent Woodleigh Village. The development will be ready by the second half of 2022.

Sengkang Grand Residences and Sengkang Grand Mall
A new 3.7-hectare mixed-use development will be built next to Buangkok MRT station. To be developed by CapitaLand and City Developments Limited, the S$777.78 million development will house a bus interchange, three-storey mall with a hawker centre and childcare centre, a community club which will be Singapore's largest, and a condominium containing 680 units. This comes after the developers won a tender in 2018. The development will be completed by 2022. The condominium and mall are named Sengkang Grand Residences and Sengkang Grand Mall, respectively.

Pasir Ris 8 and Pasir Ris Mall 
As part of the Remaking Our Heartland 3 (ROH3) plans, a new mixed-use development will be built on an estimated 409,000 sqft of vacant land next to Pasir Ris MRT station. To be developed by Allgreen Properties and Kerry Properties, the development will house an air-conditioned Pasir Ris Bus Interchange with an exclusive pick-up point for full-time NSmen undergoing military training on Pulau Tekong, a two-storey mall with estimated retail of GFA 375,000 and a town plaza, a polyclinic, a childcare centre and a condominium with 8 blocks comprising 487 units. The condominium and mall are named Pasir Ris 8 and Pasir Ris Mall, respectively. The mall is directly linked to current East West Line and the future Cross Line Island Line, making it an interchange along 2 major MRT lines.

Piccadilly Grand and Piccadilly Galleria 
Developed by City Developments Limited and MCL Land, a new mixed-use development in Farrer Park comprising Piccadilly Grand and Piccadilly Galleria is currently under construction. The development consists of three 23-storey residential blocks, housing 407 units, above a  retail podium and a childcare centre. To be completed by 2026, the development will be directly linked to Farrer Park MRT station.

One Holland Village 
Part of the Urban Redevelopment Authority (URA) plans to revitalise Holland Village, mixed-use development One Holland Village by Far East Organisation is set to be the main focal point in the rejuvenation. The development consists of residential apartments, serviced apartments, retail, office, and community spaces.

The residential component, named One Holland Village Residences, offers a total of 296 residential units split into three blocks. The lower half of the first block will house Quincy House, made up of 255 serviced apartments, while the upper half will have 27 luxury private units under Quincy Private Residences. The second and tallest block, a 34-storey residential tower, will house 248 units under Sereen. The final block, named Leven, is a three-storey building with architecture inspired by walk-up apartments found in nearby Tiong Bahru and Chip Bee Gardens. Leven will be made up of 21 units with spiral staircases and roof terraces.

Tenants in the  retail component include Cold Storage, Guardian, Bedrock Bar & Grill, The Rice Company, and The Projector. The retail mall will be the first-of-its-kind, low-rise urban lifestyle hub in Singapore, with a mix of outdoor and indoor spaces. A  community space will also be set aside for an Arts Centre developed by The Rice Company.

Community spaces will be split into four main compounds: Village Square, Village Green, Village Central, and the Village Deck. These spaces aim to foster interactions within the community and for visitors to relax in.

The residential component of One Holland Village is estimated to be completed by the end of 2024, while the commercial zone is estimated to be completed in mid-2022.

Heart of Yew Tee 
Announced on 22 September 2019, the upcoming Heart of Yew Tee will house 68 two-room Flexi flats for seniors, a community club, a polyclinic, a kidney dialysis centre, and a hawker centre.

The integrated development, consisting of a 10-storey residential block and a 6-storey commercial block, modeled after the award-winning Kampung Admiralty, will replace the existing hardcourt at Yew Tee Close next to Yew Tee MRT station. It is estimated to be completed by the second half of 2026. It will be the second such 'vertical' kampung, after Kampung Admiralty opened in 2018.

Harmony Village @ Bukit Batok 
Harmony Village @ Bukit Batok is the maiden launch of the new Community Care Apartments which is a new type of public housing, with senior-friendly design features and subscription to care services, designed to support seniors aged 65 years and above to age independently within the community. Situated at Bukit Batok, the 169-unit development will be integrated with a hawker centre, activity centre, and a community garden. Each floor in the 15-storey residential block will also feature about 50 square metres of communal space for residents to mingle.

Construction for Harmony Village @ Bukit Batok is expected to be completed in 2024.

Chill @ Chong Pang 
Chill @ Chong Pang is an upcoming 0.9-hectare community integrated development in Yishun, to be constructed on a site currently occupied by Chong Pang Community Club and Block 102 Yishun Avenue 5. Announced on 8 September 2020, the development will house a new community club, a market and hawker centre, and retail shops. It will also feature three swimming pools, a gymnasium, and fitness studios.

The adjacent Chong Pang Market and Food Centre will be relocated to the new development when completed. The site will then be redeveloped into a community plaza by 2028.

Construction for Chill @ Chong Pang is expected to begin in 2022 and completed in 2027.

Ke Ju Hakka Village 
Expected to be completed by end-2024, Ke Ju is an upcoming seven-storey building to be developed by The Char Yong (Dabu) Association in Geylang. The building, with a light screen facade displaying Hakka embroidery patterns, will take the form of a traditional Hakka communal residence, blending modern and traditional Hakka architectural and design elements. It will also feature terrace gardens inspired by the Hakka mountainscapes in China with a creeping fig pavilion as a centrepiece. The building's first two floors will include gallery areas, courtyard spaces for small performances, a library, a cooking studio, and a multi-purpose hall.

CanningHill Piers and CanningHill Square (Redevelopment of Liang Court)

A new mixed-use, integrated development named CanningHill Piers will be built on the current Liang Court complex with a 696-unit condominium spread across two residential towers, a 2-storey retail mall named CanningHill Square, a 460- to 475-room Moxy hotel by Marriott replacing Novotel, and a 192-unit Somerset serviced residence. Developed by CapitaLand, Ascott REIT and City Developments Limited, the redeveloped complex will open in phases from 2024.

The development will be directly linked underground to the Fort Canning MRT station.

Newport Tower and Newport Residences (Redevelopment of Fuji Xerox Towers) 
Vacated as of July 2021, the existing Fuji Xerox Towers will be demolished and redeveloped by City Developments Limited into a 45-storey mixed-use integrated development named Newport Plaza, Newport Tower, and Newport Residences. The development will house commercial space, offices, approximately 256 residences, and serviced apartments.

Paya Lebar Green (Redevelopment of Certis Cisco Centre) 
Broken-ground on 1 December 2022, the existing Certis Cisco Centre at Paya Lebar is set to be redeveloped by Lendlease and Certis. Named Paya Lebar Green, the development consists of two new buildings, one twelve storeys tall and the other, eight storeys, housing Grade-A office space. End-of-trip facilities such as shower and locker facilities will also be featured in the development. A new canal park and electric vehicle charging parking spaces will also be constructed as part of the redevelopment.

When completed in 2024, Paya Lebar Green will be one of Singapore's most advanced and green Grade-A workplaces.

Sky Eden (Redevelopment of Bedok Point) 
On 1 July 2021, plans to redevelop Bedok Point were announced. Named Sky Eden, the new mixed-use development consists approximately 158 residential units with twelve retail units at the ground floor. This comes after low footfall at the mall after nearby Bedok Mall opened beside the Bedok Bus Interchange and MRT station.

CQ @ Clarke Quay (Revamp of Clarke Quay) 

Announced by CapitaLand on 26 July 2022, the existing Clarke Quay area will be rejuvenated to turn it into a full-day destination. Apart from its current nightlife offerings, the revamped area will offer day trade and retail offerings such as a FairPrice Finest outlet with in-store dining, a brewery, and a pottery-themed cafe. Existing anchor tenants, Zouk Group and 1-Group, will also expand their current offerings to attract the daytime crowd to the area.

Aside from the restoration of the area's conservation warehouses, heritage panels, manhole covers, and bronze plate tiles will also be dotted around the area to highlight Clarke Quay's history. Read Bridge will also be upgraded with new lookout points.

The rejuvenation will be carried out in phases and expected to be fully completed in the third quarter of 2023.

Transformation of Orchard Road 
Announced on 30 January 2019, the 2.4 km Orchard Road will be revamped and rejuvenated with unique experiences and offerings across four sub-precincts namely Tanglin, Orchard, Somerset, and Dhoby Ghaut. New retail concepts, attractions, events, and entertainment will be established to strengthen its position as a lifestyle destination. More trees and shrubs, with different colours for each sub-precincts will also be planted along both sides of the road.

Tanglin will primarily be an arts and artisanal mixed-use neighbourhood. For example, the conserved Tudor Court is planned to house more arts, cultural, and lifestyle offerings, while the covered canal is proposed to be turned into a courtyard for public art and outdoor dining. The neighbourhood will be mainly served by the Orchard Boulevard MRT station.

In Orchard, more mixed-use developments will be constructed on empty plots of land along Orchard Boulevard above Orchard MRT station. To enhance pedestrian connectivity, side streets will be redeveloped while elevated link bridges are planned to be built at the junctions of Orchard Road and Patterson Road.

Somerset will continue to be an energetic youth hub with new lifestyle options and the upcoming transformation of the  Grange Road carpark into a dedicated public events space for pop-up events and entertainment such as flea markets and food trucks.

Dhoby Ghaut will primarily be a lush greenery zone with attractions that are targeted at families. Parts of the road are planned to be converted to pedestrian use to connect existing green spaces at Istana Park and Dhoby Ghaut Green, while the current open space at Plaza Singapura will be transformed into a large garden with playgrounds and sheltered spaces for events. The  Istana Park is proposed to be expanded and redesigned, featuring an orchid-themed garden and a rustic nature play garden with water play areas. This proposal would result in a realignment of Orchard Road from The Istana to SMA House. The Istana Park would also be better integrated with the Istana's entrance and commercial developments in its surrounding with roads that include use by pedestrians.

Integration of Bugis Village and Bugis Street 
Announced on 16 January 2020, CapitaLand has won a three-year tender for the integrated management of Bugis Village and adjacent Bugis Street. Under the management, CapitaLand plans to revamp the area. To enhance connectivity, a new link bridge connecting Bugis Street to Bugis+ to provide sheltered access from Bugis MRT station is currently being explored. Plans are also being explored for the integrated development to house a day-to-night market, a retail incubator, and areas for co-living and co-working. A section will also be converted into a hub offering brands a space to innovate new ways of creating curated brand experiences or pilot new concepts.

A series of loose and colourful container boxes with open display areas is also being planned. To be named Bugis Box, it will be a modern interpretation of street markets with trendy bites, quirky gifts, and trending fashion accessories. It will be similar to South Korea's Common Ground.

There are also plans for a dining area for visitors to try out Singaporean and Southeast Asian hawker food. Diners will also be able to try making some dishes or purchase Singaporean food packs.

Redevelopment of AXA Tower 

Announced by the Urban Redevelopment Authority on 5 August 2022, the upcoming mixed-use development to replace the existing AXA Tower in Tanjong Pagar has been granted a maximum approved height of 305 metres. Surpassing the 284 metres-tall Guoco Tower, the 63-storey skyscraper is set to be Singapore's tallest building when completed in 2028. The development will comprise commercial spaces, offices, a hotel, and residential units with sky terraces.

Redevelopment of Shaw Tower 

As one of the older buildings in the Beach Road / Ophir-Rochor Corridor, the 42-year-old Shaw Tower will be redeveloped into a 35-storey Grade A office and retail tower as part of the rejuvenation of the area. The new Shaw Tower will have 400,000 square feet of office space and 30,000 square feet of retail space. When completed, the development will be linked-up with adjacent Guoco Midtown and surrounding developments.

The redevelopment is planned to have its construction synchronised with Guoco Midtown's to minimise disruption in the area and ensure that both buildings will be ready at the same time. The new Shaw Tower is scheduled to be completed by 2025.

Redevelopment of Comcentre 
On 23 February 2022, Singtel announced an over S$2 billion plan to redevelop Comcentre from 2024 into a pair of 20-storey buildings with a floor area of approximately 110,000 square metres. The buildings will be equipped with the latest digital technologies and sustainable features, as well as being well integrated into the surroundings with an underground connection to Somerset MRT station. Aside from a retail podium housing retail spaces and Singtel's new flagship store, the development will also feature an elevated rooftop park and an integrated wellness hub.

The new Comcentre will be developed in a joint venture with another developer that will be selected in May, although two were shortlisted earlier. Singtel will divest its stake to the joint venture company with a majority stake, although it will take up 30 per cent of the space as the anchor tenant. The new Comcentre will also be equipped with hybrid working spaces for other tenants. It will be completed by 2028, with Singtel working in other offices in the meantime.

Redevelopment of Central Mall and Central Square 
After the acquisition of Central Square at Havelock Road in 2022, City Developments Limited will be redeveloping Central Mall, Central Square, and an adjacent cluster of conservation shophouses into a large-scale mixed-use lifestyle hub comprising a hospitality component, serviced apartments, and commercial spaces such as offices and retail units.

Redevelopment of JCube and Jurong Regional Library 
It was announced that JCube will close down on 6 August 2023 to make way for a 40-storey residential development with commercial space on its lower levels while the existing Jurong Regional Library will be relocated to the Jurong East Integrated Transport Hub site near Jurong East MRT station in 2028.

The new mixed-use development, linked directly to the Jurong East MRT station and surrounding buildings via J-Walk, is expected to be completed in 2027.

Rejuvenation of Gillman Barracks 

Announced on 24 May 2022 by the Singapore Land Authority, the existing Gillman Barracks will undergo an approxiamtely S$2 million revamp. To be carried out in two phases, the rejuvenation will transform Gillman Barracks into a creative lifestyle enclave and introduce new offerings such as a farmers' market and more food and beverage and lifestyle concepts. Existing infrastructure will also be upgraded such as covered walkways within the precinct and to the nearby Labrador Park MRT station and a new playground.

First phase of tenders for the commercial spaces have been released in May 2022. The rejuvenation project is expected to be completed in 2023.

Raffles Sentosa Resort & Spa Singapore 
Announced on 25 June 2019, a second Raffles Hotel named Raffles Sentosa Resort & Spa Singapore will be built on Sentosa at the site adjacent to the existing Sofitel Singapore Sentosa Resort & Spa. The one million square-foot exclusive luxury resort will be an all-villa resort, featuring 61 villas, each with its own private courtyard and pool. Hotel facilities include a bar, multiple restaurants, a fitness centre, a celebrations room, and two meeting rooms.

Set to open in 2022, the resort will be Singapore's first villa-only hotel.

Proposed Waterfront Hotel at River Valley 
Released for sale on 5 December 2019, the  hotel site located directly above Fort Canning MRT station can potentially yield a maximum of 530 hotel rooms. The site is envisioned to be developed into a distinctive waterfront landmark and offer seamless connections between the two attractions of Fort Canning Park and Singapore River.

Proposed Retail and Office Development at Punggol Central 
Published by the Urban Redevelopment Authority (URA) on 21 October 2022, approximately 1-hectare of land adjacent to Punggol MRT station will be developed into a mixed-use office and retail development to provide more office spaces and retail options for the town's residents.

Industrial

Jurong Innovation District (JID)
First announced in the 2016 Singapore Budget, the Jurong Innovation District (JID) aims to provide a conducive environment for startups, and encourage innovation. To be developed by JTC, it will be located near NTU, Tengah and CleanTech Park, and the first phase will be completed by 2022.

Hyundai Mobility Global Innovation Centre 
Hyundai Motor announced on 31 March 2020 that it will be building a  open innovation lab in the JID, named Hyundai Mobility Global Innovation Centre, to develop future mobility technologies for expansion into other markets. The lab will test out a small-scale electric vehicle (EV) production facility before creating an automated platform to manufacture smart vehicles. An on-demand production system where customers can build their customised vehicles will also be tested out in the lab. Alongside these, Hyundai will also carry out tests on multi-modal mobility services, on-demand shuttle, and e-scooters. The lab is expected to be completed by the second half of 2022.

SATS Food Hub 
Broken-ground on 7 April 2022, SATS Food Hub is an upcoming S$150 million innovative food hub to be operated by SATS in the JID. Expected to be completed by 2024, the 5-storey building will bring together several existing catering operations at Pandan Loop under a single roof. Food manufacturing facilities, production kitchens, innovation lab, and a centre for warehousing and logistics are part of the facilities to be housed in the building. As an innovation hub, the building will feature an open innovation platform for the testing of new products and services. Automation, robotics, and Internet of Things (IoT) capabilities will also be used in its processes.

Surbana Jurong Campus 
Broken-ground on 18 January 2019, the approximately 69,000 square-metre Surbana Jurong Campus is set to be Surbana Jurong's global headquarters when completed. Designed by Moshe Safdie, the ten-block campus will be integrated with the surrounding landscape and feature green technology such as solar panels. Efficient construction techniques such as precasted materials will also be used in the construction of the campus.

36 electric vehicle chargers by SP Group will be initially installed at the campus before ramping up to a total of 250 chargers, making Surbana Jurong Campus the largest public electric vehicle charging hub in Southeast Asia.

The campus is expected to be completed by 2022 and accommodate close to 4,000 employees when opened.

Punggol Digital District (PDD)
First announced in the 2015 National Day Rally and 2017 Singapore Budget, the  Punggol Digital District (PDD) will be Singapore's first enterprise district, with JTC being the master developer. Located in Punggol North, it will house a business park comprising digital and cybersecurity industries, as well as the Singapore Institute of Technology (SIT) new permanent campus in Punggol. It will create approximately 28,000 new jobs and offer Punggol residents additional dining, leisure, and retail spots.

The developments will be integrated side by side, encouraging collaboration between industries and academia. Having the SIT campus integrated with the JTC business park will support an ecosystem for digital and technology organisations in the district, such as doing trials on new concepts before scaling them up on a national level. SIT faculty and students will be able to collaborate with industry professionals on relevant projects and test-bedding opportunities. For example, new ideas conceived by students in SIT could be tested in the PDD, enabling a faster market access. On the other hand, organisations in the PDD can tap into SIT's applied learning and research capabilities and talent pool.

Campus Boulevard will be an 800-metre street for pedestrians lined with retail shops and F&B outlets. In addition, a 1.3 km heritage trail, converted from the existing Punggol Road will extend from Punggol Waterway Park to Punggol Point Park. A market village by the waterfront will also offer new retail and dining options located at the eastern end of Campus Boulevard.

Other than the existing Punggol LRT West Loop, the district will also be served by the upcoming Punggol Coast MRT station and a future bus interchange.

The plan was officially unveiled on 21 January 2018, with the JTC buildings and SIT campus opening gradually in 2023. Construction started on 17 January 2020, with a new Open Digital Platform unveiled to monitor utilities usage and testbed new technologies.

On 28 July 2021, the first four companies setting up in the District were unveiled, being Boston Dynamics, Delta Electronics Int’l (Singapore), Group-IB and Wanxiang. The completion date has since been pushed back to 2024.

Sungei Kadut Eco-District (SKED) 
Announced on 6 February 2020, the existing Sungei Kadut Industrial Estate will be developed and transformed in phases, forming the overall 500-hectare Sungei Kadut Eco-District (SKED). Other than traditional manufacturing industries, the district will also house new sectors such as agri-tech and environmental technology. The district will be split into four primary precincts namely Sungei Kadut North, Sungei Kadut Central, Sungei Kadut South, and the Agri-Food Innovation Park.

The district will have nature and heritage trials as well as a park network with lush greenery connecting to waterfront parks and existing park connectors. Co-working and co-living spaces, together with leisure amenities will also be built to attract the general public to visit SKED during after-work hours and the weekends. Iconic old buildings will be refurbished and repurposed into art and lifestyle hubs housing retail and recreational facilities. Farm-to-fork cafes, farmers' markets, live performances, and pop-up markets will also be present to transform the district into a lifestyle destination for the wider community.

The district will be served by new roads and the future Sungei Kadut MRT station. A mobility corridor specially for public buses, cyclists, and pedestrians will also be built.

As part of the first phase, the  Agri-Food Innovation Park will house high-tech farming and R&D activities, such as indoor farming and aquaculture hatcheries.

Dover Knowledge District 
As part of the Draft Master Plan 2019 by the Urban Redevelopment Authority (URA), the future Dover Knowledge District will be a mixed-use site meant to be an extension to the existing one-north district.

Lim Chu Kang Agri-Food Cluster 
Shared facilities will be developed to lower production costs and the use of resources. Aside from the core agri-food production, relevant activities such as farmers' markets and education tours are also currently under consideration.

Development of the site will be carried out in phases starting from 2024. When completed, the cluster will have the capabilities to produce more than three times its current food production.

Changi City 
A designated area in Changi East adjacent to Singapore Changi Airport, Changi City is planned to be a lifestyle business cluster made up of the existing Singapore University of Technology and Design (SUTD) and Changi Business Park, as well as the future Changi East Urban District. It will be a major waterfront district with recreational and tourism facilities/amenities while offering seamless "fly-ferry" connections between Changi Airport Terminal 5 and Tanah Merah Ferry Terminal due to their close proximity to one another.

The future Changi East Urban District, situated between the upcoming Changi Airport Terminal 5 and the existing Tanah Merah Ferry Terminal, will house offices, smart work centres, conference rooms and halls, hotels, and serviced apartments in landscaped public spaces.

Elementum (Biopolis Phase 6)

On 27 November 2019, Senior Minister of State for Trade and Industry Koh Poh Koon announced that Biopolis Phase 6 will be built by mid-2022 to meet demand from biotechnology start-ups as part of initiatives to better support them. The site was subsequently awarded by JTC Corporation to Ho Bee on 16 March 2020, which will design the 12-storey building, named Elementum, with elements of nature, technology and wellness incorporated.

Labrador underground substation 
Set to be the first large-scale underground electrical substation in Southeast Asia when completed, the 230,000-volt Labrador underground substation will be able to power up to eight towns nearby such as Pasir Panjang and Clementi. A 34-storey commercial development will also be built above the substation.

Both the substation and commercial building are scheduled to be completed in 2024.

Tuas Nexus 
Currently under construction at a site next to the Tuas Water Reclamation Plant in Tuas View Basin, Tuas Nexus is an integrated waste management facility. It will be the first in Singapore to treat both used water and food waste in the same plant to produce biogas for electricity generation. The facility will be entirely energy self-sufficient with the use of renewable energy sources such as solar panels and the conversion of heat produced by the incinerators to electricity. Excess electricity generated will be exported back to the national grid, sufficient to power up to 300,000 homes.

Tuas Nexus will also help to expand the lifespan of Semakau Landfill as it allows incineration bottom ash to be extracted from waste.

The first phase of the facility is targeted to be completed by 2024.

JTC semiconSpace 
To be located in Tampines Wafer Fab Park, the JTC semiconSpace is a new semiconductor facility that will be built in three phases. The facility will be built in accordance with the stringent requirements of semiconductor manufacturing operations such as vibration-sensitive flooring.

The first phase of the facility is scheduled to be ready by 2021.

Refurbishment of wafer fabrication parks 
Announced on 1 November 2019, JTC will be refurbishing its four existing wafer fabrication parks in Pasir Ris, Tampines, Woodlands, and North Coast. The improvements include sheltered walkways, cycling paths, additional trees by the roadside, and more lifestyle amenities.

Enhancement works for all four parks are expected to be completed by 2025.

Redevelopment of Defu Industrial Estate (Defu Industrial Park) 
Identified by the Government for redevelopment in 2012, Defu Industrial Estate will be transformed over the next 15 to 20 years along the vision of "A Green and Sustainable Industrial Park of Tomorrow". The redeveloped industrial park will be renamed Defu Industrial Park. Existing factories will be progressively replaced with newer and more modern industrial complexes, with the entire industry park featuring landscaped greenery and environmentally sustainable features.

Defu Industrial Park will be split into three key zones. The Northern and Central Zone will house strategic industries such as logistics, precision engineering, info-communications and media, electronics, clean energy and biomedical, while the Southern Zone will be set aside for new modern industrial complexes to house the existing industrial enterprises.

The redevelopment will be carried out in three phases with Phase 1 nearing completion. 219 factories out of the existing 1,046 factories, will be relocated to two new complexes that are nearing completion. Bedok Food City will house the factories that are in the food industry, while Defu Industrial City will house factories in the general industries.

The total amount of factory floor space of the new industry park will be increased to 2.1 million square-metre.

Rejuvenation of Singapore Science Park 1 
Located in the Kent Ridge region, CapitaLand and Ascendas Reit are currently redeveloping existing buildings within the Singapore Science Park 1 as part of a multi-phase rejuvenation of the precinct. Eight buildings in the park have been redeveloped as of November 2021.

1 Science Park Drive 
Announced on 15 November 2021, the existing 1 Science Park Drive is set to be redeveloped into a life science and innovation campus. Located beside Kent Ridge MRT station, the site will house three interconnected Grade A office buildings ranging from nine to fifteen floors. The development will also have an event plaza with retail spaces and amenities, and an amphitheatre. The redevelopment is expected to be completed by 2025.

3 Science Park Drive (Former Franklin Building) 
Set to be completed by 2024, the existing Franklin building located at 3 Science Park Drive is currently being redeveloped into an integrated development comprising business park spaces and serviced residences.

Residential

Tengah New Town

The Tengah New Town is a 700ha development that will integrate nature in it. It will feature five development zones, each with its own unique identity, with a car-free town centre; the first in Singapore. It was announced on 8 September 2016, with the first units to be released in 2018. The town could potentially yield up to 42,000 new homes, with more than 70 per cent of the units allocated for public housing, which would take up to two decades to complete. Plantation, the first district out of five, was unveiled on 4 September 2018. The district pays homage to the farmers who resided there back in the 1950s. The first flats were launched on 13 November 2018.

Punggol 21

Punggol 21 is a development initiative that plans to develop the mostly undeveloped town of Punggol into a residential new town. Currently, the southern parts of Punggol are developed, mostly with HDB flats. There are ongoing projects to build a town centre, supposedly with an air-conditioned bus interchange. A man-made canal called Punggol Waterway was built, connecting the Serangoon Reservoir and Punggol Reservoir. Many developments are proposed to be built along the canal, such as shopping centres and many more HDB flats. There will be recreation clubs, community centres, sports clubs, polyclinics and many others, attracting many people to live and visit Punggol. There are plans to develop Punggol Point, which currently only has a beach. It will propose to have a seafood restaurant and maybe more HDB flats in the near vicinity. More parking lots are under construction, and this will attract many people to the presently remote beach. The northwest of Punggol will be developed and the West Loop of the Punggol LRT Line will be in operation, serving the area.

Kampong Bugis

Announced during the 2017 Budget, Kampong Bugis is a new waterfront development zone in Singapore, which will be given to a master developer, giving flexibility in planning the town layouts as opposed to carving each land plot by itself. The area will comprise approximately 4,000 private residential units, primarily served by Lavender MRT station, Kallang MRT station, and Bendemeer MRT station. Kallang Riverside Park will also be redeveloped into a waterfront park as part of the plan.

Bayshore 
First announced on 16 October 2017, the new 60-hectare Bayshore district, located adjacent to East Coast Park, will comprise more than 10,000 Housing and Development Board (HDB) and private residential units. A 1 km public transit street will run through the district, lined with green spaces, shops, and amenities. The district will also feature an integrated transport hub at Bedok South MRT station. A new linear park will also be built along the heritage seawalls with a new sea pavilion.

The district will be launched for development after 2024, when Bayshore MRT station and Bedok South MRT station are operational.

Holland Plain 
Announced on 16 October 2017, Holland Plain is an upcoming 34-hectare precinct which will comprise approximately 2,500 private residential units. The precinct is located near King Albert Park MRT station and the Rail Corridor. More than 30 per cent of the area will feature lush greenery including a wetland park and community plain. Sky-rise greenery and green routes are also being planned for the district.

The precinct will begin to be developed from 2021.

Marina South 

First announced as part of the Urban Redevelopment Authority (URA) Master Plan 2014, the future 21.5-hectare Marina South precinct will house over 9,000 private residential units built next to Gardens by the Bay. The precinct is envisioned to be a car-lite and pedestrian-friendly neighbourhood. Retail shops and community facilities/amenities will be located at street level, followed by residences above, for increased convenience.

Major arterial roads in the area will also be realigned to create "wind corridors" where winds during the monsoon seasons will be funneled into the area. Future buildings in the precinct will also feature varying heights to channel air downwards to the surface. Each building will also be located further apart for better ventilation. All of these would facilitate better wind flow, resulting in a lower ambient temperature and comfort for those in the precinct.

On 12 January 2022, it was announced that the upcoming Marina South MRT station on the Thomson-East Coast MRT line will remain closed until surrounding housing developments are completed.

Lentor Hills 
First announced as part of the Urban Redevelopment Authority (URA) Master Plan 2014, the existing 30-hectare forest bordering Teacher's Estate will be cleared for the development of private homes. Located near Lentor MRT station, the new neighbourhood is planned around the existing hillock. Two green plots of the existing forests will be kept, along with new parks such as a Linear Park and the main Hillock Park. A mixed-use development with retail amenities, Lentor Modern, will be built above Lentor MRT station to serve residents in the area.

Mount Pleasant 
Announced on 23 November 2021, approximately 5,000 Housing and Development Board (HDB) flats will be built on the Old Police Academy site in Mount Pleasant. Part of the Singapore Polo Club will also be acquired as part of the development. The design of the  estate will be inspired by the nature and heritage in the 1920s-developed area. Four existing Old Police Academy buildings and a part of the parade square will be retained and refreshed into community spaces. Surrounded by residential blocks with sky and roof gardens, a low-rise neighbourhood centre, designed to be open and green, will house amenities such as retail units.

The first Build-to-Order (BTO) housing project is set to be launched within the next five years.

On 12 January 2022, it was announced that the upcoming Mount Pleasant MRT station on the Thomson-East Coast MRT line will remain closed until surrounding housing developments are completed.

Keppel Club 
As part of the Greater Southern Waterfront plan, the  Keppel Club site will be redeveloped into a prime waterfront residential district. The existing private golf club will be replaced by approximately 9,000 Housing and Development Board (HDB) and private residential units when its lease expires in 2021.

Public housing units in the prime area will be using a new pricing model to lessen the effect where owners sell their units at much higher prices than initially purchased at subsidised rates from the Housing and Development Board (HDB).

Dover Forest 
Announced by the Housing and Development Board (HDB) on 30 July 2021, the revised development plan for the  Dover Forest, located in Queenstown, will see the approximately 11-hectare eastern half of the forest be developed for public housing while the western half of the forest will be temporarily preserved due to its rich biodiversity.

The eastern half of the forest will feature five hectares of greenery, including a park with a natural stream. Also, housing blocks will be designed to take into consideration the existing Ulu Pandan canal, which will be upgraded. For example, blocks nearer to the canal will be lower than the rest of the development to achieve a tiered effect and maximise views of the canal. A commercial development housing amenities will be built near Dover MRT station to provide a link between the station and the developed area.

Plans for the western half of the forest will be reviewed in 2030 when further development is required. However, a portion of it will be safeguarded as a nature park.

In addition, as Singapore's first car-lite HDB precinct, the new estate will see roads placed only along its perimeter, away from pedestrain walkways and cycling paths.

The estate was launched in 2022 with its first Build-to-Order (BTO) housing project named Ulu Pandan Banks.

Dakota Crescent 
To be redeveloped into a mixed-use precinct, the existing Dakota Crescent area will be largely revitalised with new public housing developments planned around six preserved Singapore Improvement Trust (SIT) blocks and the iconic dove playground that were built in the 1950s. Although not formally gazetted for conservation, the central cluster of SIT-built blocks will be retained and repurposed for civic and community uses due to their historical significance as one of Singapore's first public housing projects built before the formation of the current Housing and Development Board (HDB).

All residents previously residing in the 17 low-rise SIT blocks have vacated in 2017.

In February 2022, the first Build-to-Order (BTO) housing project, Dakota Crest, located in the former site of the low-rise flats was launched.

Farrer Park 
Announced on 25 April 2022, a  site in Farrer Park is set to be developed into a public housing estate with approximately 1,600 Housing and Development Board (HDB) flats integrated with sports and recreational facilities to preserve and highlight the sporting heritage of the area. Approximately 20 per cent of the site will be reserved as open spaces, including a  central green space with a field and a park. To be integrated within one of the housing developments, the existing Farrer Park Boxing Gym will be retained and repurposed into a multi-purpose community sporting space for residents residing in the estate. However, due to technical and cost considerations and difficulties, the existing Farrer Park Swimming Complex will not be retained but replaced with a new sporting centre housing sports facilities such as swimming pools. The new estate will also feature sports facilities integrated within a multi-storey car park, a jogging track connecting the various facilities in the estate, and commercial and social amenities such as retail shops and a childcare centre.

The estate was launched in 2023 with its first Build-to-Order (BTO) housing project named Farrer Park Fields.

Pang Sua Woodland 
Located in Choa Chu Kang, the existing 15-hectare Pang Sua Woodland is part of an approximately 22-hectare site to be developed with high-density residential developments integrated with the nearby Rail Corridor and Pang Sua Canal. A key recommendation of establishing a green corridor within the site to preserve the ecological links to surrounding nature areas was published for public feedback on 5 April 2022 by the Housing and Development Board (HDB) as part of an environmental study for the development of the area.

Following the environmental study and public feedback, HDB published the redevelopment's revised plans on 6 July 2022. Aside from healthy and mature tree clusters within the sitre, at least two hectares of the existing woodland along the existing Pang Sua Canal will also be preserved. The original alignment of the Rail Corridor will also be retained as much as possible as part of the redevelopment.

Chencharu 
Announced in August 2022, ORTO leisure park and Ground-Up Initiative will have to vacate their current premises at Lorong Chencharu by June 2023 to make way for new housing developments. Located near Khatib MRT station, the nearly  Chencharu area was identified by the Urban Redevelopment Authority as a future residential precinct as part of Yishun's long-term land use plans.

An approximately 100-year-old colonial-era bungalow located within the area is set to be preserved and integrated as part of the new residential area.

Bidadari 

First announced on 29 August 2013, Bidadari is a new 93-hectare residential estate near Serangoon. It consists of four housing zones namely Alkaff District, Woodleigh District, Park Edge District, and Bartley Heights District. When fully developed, the estate will house 11,000 housing units of which 1,000 units will be private flats. The estate will feature a 10-hectare Bidadari Park housing a new Alkaff Lake, a 700-metre heritage walk, experiential trials, a Memorial Garden and a children play area named Adventure Playwoods. There will also be a tree-lined "greenway" along Bidadari Park Drive and through the entire estate, named Bidadari Greenway, for pedestrians and cyclists.

The estate will also house a mixed-use development named The Woodleigh Residences and The Woodleigh Mall. Aside from a new bus interchange, the estate will also be served by existing Woodleigh MRT station, Potong Pasir MRT station, and Bartley MRT station.

The estate was launched in 2015 with its first Build-to-Order (BTO) housing projects: Alkaff LakeView, Alkaff CourtView, and Alkaff Vista.

Tampines North 
First announced on 29 August 2013, Tampines North is a new 240-hectare residential estate in the existing Tampines town. It consists of four housing zones namely Park West District, Green Walk District, Park East District, and Boulevard District. When fully developed, the estate will house 21,000 housing units of which 17,000 units will be Housing and Development Board (HDB) units. Apart from small-scale neighbourhood park spaces, there will also be two major parks in the estate. Boulevard Park will run through the entire estate, connecting residents from Sun Plaza Park to Sungei Api Api, while Quary Park will feature a sand quarry pond, inspired by the town's history. A landmark bridge will be built to link Quarry Park to Sun Plaza Park and Boulevard Park, seamlessly integrating the new estate into the existing town.

The estate will also house a mixed-use development integrated with a new bus interchange. Aside from the new bus interchange, the estate will also be served by the future Tampines North MRT station.

The estate was launched in 2014 with its first Build-to-Order (BTO) housing project named Tampines GreenRidges.

Population White Paper: Land Use Plan 2030
In 2013, the Singaporean government announced a new development plan "Singapore 2030" for Singapore, designed to accommodate the growing population. It is assumed that the population will reach between 6.5 and 6.9 million by 2030. Singapore will increase its land area to  square kilometers through land reclamation from the sea. Most of the reclamation will be done at Tekong and Tuas islands, with additional reclamation points beyond 2030 including Marina East, Changi East, and Pasir Ris. Singapore 2030 is part of the Land Use Plan to develop the mostly parts such as Tampines North (expansion), Tengah and Bidadari. There are ongoing projects such as 100,000 HDB flats to be built until 2030, followed by Bukit Brown, and somehow post-2030 plans will consist of Paya Lebar Airbase and Southern Waterfront City. 
High-density towns with a full range of amenities such as childcare centers, hospitals, and recreational areas will be built. About 60% of Singapore's land will be set aside for housing, industry, and community facilities, up from 52%. In addition, 700,000 new housing units will be built, the size of the rail network will be doubled, and some golf courses and military training grounds will make way for redevelopment. According to the plans, 85% of Singaporeans will live close to a park.

One Pearl Bank
One Pearl Bank is a condominium currently being redeveloped from Pearl Bank Apartments by CapitaLand, coming after an en-bloc sale in 2018. The 178m condominium will have two 39-storey towers with 774 units, sky bridges linking the top floor and 18 sky gardens. When completed in 2023, the condominium will be the tallest in Outram.

Avenue South Residence 
Avenue South Residence is a 1074-unit condominium currently being built at Silat Avenue, along the historic KTM Rail Corridor. Developed by UOL Group Limited, the project consists of two 56-storey residential tower blocks, five conserved four-storey Singapore Improvement Trust (SIT) blocks, commercial units, and a childcare centre. There will also be sky gardens and courts in the entire development. When completed in 2026, the twin towers will be the world's tallest prefabricated skyscrapers, a title currently held by another pair of residential buildings in Singapore - Clement Canopy.

Riviere 
Developed by Frasers Property Singapore, Riviere is a pair of 36-storey luxury residential towers, housing 455 units by the Singapore River. The development also consists of three conserved 100-year-old godowns/warehouses, that is the former site of Zouk nightclub, and a newly built four-storey block with 80 serviced apartments. The 18,300 square-foot godowns will be restored to house several amenities and retail outlets.

The site was the last available Government Land Sales (GLS) site along the prime stretch of the Singapore River. At 36 storeys, Riviere is set to become the new landmark in the Robertson Quay area, as most of the surrounding residential developments are capped at 10 storeys. The development is expected to be completed by 2023.

The Reef at King's Dock 
Developed by Mapletree and Keppel Land, The Reef at King's Dock is a 429-unit condominium currently being built at Keppel Bay in Harbourfront. The condominium will feature Singapore's first floating deck and underwater marine viewing area in a residential development. The 180-metre floating deck will house several swimming pools of different sizes and a private marine viewing area for residents and their visitors to view and appreciate the marine ecology in the historic King's Dock, which was once the world's second largest dock when it opened in 1913.

The development is expected to be completed by 2025.

Transport

Thomson-East Coast Line (TEL)

The whole line will be completely underground. The line opened with the first phase on 31 January 2020, and the second phase on 28 August 2021. The third phase followed suit on 13 November 2022. The remaining two stages will open from 2024 to 2025. The Thomson-East Coast Line will add greatly to the accessibility and connectivity of the current rail network, with interchanges to all other five MRT lines.

North–South Corridor (NSC)

The  North–South Corridor will stretch from Woodlands and Sembawang to the western end of the East Coast Parkway, relieving traffic on the congested Central Expressway. It will be the 11th of Singapore's expressways. Construction commenced in 2017, and is slated to be completed by 2027. The Land Transport Authority announced that the NSC will be transformed to Singapore's first integrated transport corridor featuring continuous bus lanes and cycling trunk routes, throughout the length of the route.

Changi Northern and Southern Corridor 
A two-part infrastructure project near Changi Airport designed to complement the upcoming Cross Island MRT line and future Changi Airport Terminal 5, the Changi Northern and Southern Corridor includes the widening of existing roads, building of new roads, a new viaduct, and erecting new cycling paths. Land acquisitions affecting parts of the Laguna National Golf and Country Club and three JTC Corporation plots will also take place as part of the Changi Southern Corridor construction.

The Changi Northern Corridor consists of a new viaduct being built along Loyang Avenue, between Tampines Expressway (TPE) and Loyang Way. It will be lined with noise barriers to reduce noise impact on nearby residential homes. Loyang Avenue will also have new bus lanes as well as cycling paths along the surrounding roads connected to the existing Park Connector Network (PCN). Most of the work will be completed by 2026, with the remainder by 2029, in conjunction with the Cross Island MRT line stations in the surrounding area.

The Changi Southern Corridor consists of new roads that will connect Changi Airport Terminal 5 to the East Coast Parkway (ECP) and a widened and realigned Tanah Merah Coast Road. Existing roads such as the Pan Island Expressway (PIE) will also be widened, while two flyovers will be reconfigured. New cycling paths will also be added. Works in the Southern Corridor are estimated to be completed by end-2026.

The entire project is scheduled to be completed by 2029.

Changi Airport Terminal 5

Terminal 5 is set to be ready by end 2030s. It is expected to handle 150 million passenger movements per year, up from the current 82 million. The airport terminal structure is projected to be larger than all the previous terminals combined. It will be built on reclaimed land to the east of the present terminals. As of 2020, work has been stopped for 2 years due to the ongoing COVID-19 pandemic.

Jurong Region Line (JRL)

Previously proposed as an LRT line, the Jurong Region Line was re-proposed into a fully elevated MRT line 24 km long with 24 stations. It will be the seventh line to be built with completion in 3 stages from 2027 to 2029. It will serve West Coast, Tengah and Choa Chu Kang, besides just Jurong when originally announced in 2001.

A study on the possible 7 km West Coast extension from Pandan Reservoir MRT station to Haw Par Villa MRT station on the Circle line is currently being conducted. The extension will be completed by 2030 if found feasible.

Cross Island Line (CRL)

A  line spanning across Singapore. The first phase of the Cross Island MRT line will be completed by 2030, spanning  from Changi, Loyang, Pasir Ris, Defu, Hougang, Ang Mo Kio and Bishan with 12 stations. The second phase of the line, consisting of 6 stations, will be completed by 2032.

A  extension to Punggol will also be completed by 2032, consisting of four stations: Punggol, Riviera, Elias, and Pasir Ris.

Johor Bahru-Singapore Rapid Transit System (RTS) 

The Johor Bahru-Singapore Rapid Transit System (RTS) is an upcoming 4 km cross-border light-rail link between Bukit Changar in Johor Bahru and Woodlands North MRT station in Singapore. It will transport approximately 10,000 passengers per hour each way to ease traffic on the already-congested Causeway. Facilities for customs, immigration and quarantine (CIQ) will be co-located, where passengers will only be required to undergo border clearance once, during departure.

Initially to be located as part of the Thomson-East Coast MRT line Mandai Depot, the RTS link depot will be relocated to Johor Bahru instead. Furthermore, the RTS link will be an independent Light Rail Transit (LRT) system rather than using the existing Thomson-East Coast MRT line's system as proposed initially.

Construction of the RTS Link Woodlands North station has begun on 22 January 2021. The station, to be constructed underground, will feature an underground link to the CIQ building and connected via an underground concourse to the existing Woodlands North MRT station on the Thomson-East Coast MRT line. On the other hand, construction for the viaduct and tunnels is expected to begin in the second quarter of 2021. The entire system is expected to begin operations in January 2027, replacing the current KTM shuttle train between the countries.

Circle Line Stage 6 (CCL6)

To be completed by 2026, the  extension will run from Marina Bay through Keppel, ending at HarbourFront and will close the gap between the Harbourfront and Marina Bay stations, so that the Circle Line is fully orbital. This extension will see the addition of three new stations: Keppel, Cantonment, and Prince Edward Road.

Downtown Line 3 Extension (DTLe)

To be completed by 2025, the extension will run from Expo and through East Coast area, from Xilin to Sungei Bedok. This extension will see the addition of two new stations: Xilin and Sungei Bedok, with the latter being an interchange with the Thomson-East Coast line.

North East Line Extension (NELe)

On 7 June 2017, it was announced by then-Second Minister for Transport Ng Chee Meng that the North-East Line extension was to open in 2023, a few years ahead of the expected opening date of 2030. The single station extension will span  and will serve the future Punggol North area. The station is tentatively called Punggol Coast MRT station.

On 13 November 2020, Minister of Transport Ong Ye Kung announced that the station would be completed in 2024 instead due to delays from the COVID-19 pandemic. This comes even as works progressed to 40% completion with the tunnels finished.

Hume MRT Station (DT4) 

Initially built as a "shell station" as part of the Downtown line Phase 2, Hume MRT Station (DT4), located between Beauty World MRT station and Hillview MRT station, will be opened by 2025 when the surrounding areas of Upper Bukit Timah and Hume Avenue are built up with new developments. The station has since started construction on 28 February 2021.

Jurong East Integrated Transport Hub 
Set to begin construction in the second quarter of 2021, the upcoming Jurong East Integrated Transport Hub will house community and civic institutions, a 27-storey office tower, and the new Jurong East Bus Interchange. It will also feature a 90-metre sky bridge above the existing train viaducts, connecting the office tower to an 8-storey podium block. Situated at Jurong East MRT station, the integrated transport hub will provide direct connectivity and more convenient transfers between the North South line, East West line, and the upcoming Jurong Region line.

The integrated transport hub is scheduled to be completed by 2027.

Tuas Mega Port

The S$20 billion Tuas Mega Port started its first phase of construction in 2016, with the second phase in 2019. To be opened in four stages from 2021, the port will consolidate all existing port operations at Tanjong Pagar, Pasir Panjang, Keppel, and Pulau Brani, and centralise it in the Tuas Terminal from 2027. When fully operational, the port can potentially handle a capacity of about 65 million TEUs a year, double of the current capacity. New technologies will be employed to increase productivity.

Approximately twice the size of Ang Mo Kio town, when fully operational in 2040, the Tuas Mega Port will be the world's largest fully automated terminal, with features such as automated wharf and yard functions, and fully-electric automated guided vehicles to carry out its key operations. The project broke ground on 3 October 2019.

To optimise land use, an area for leisure purposes is currently under study. The plan is to construct a  area that will be elevated 42 metres above ground to house recreational amenities such as cafes, retail stores, and a jogging track. Large retail outlets such as Tesco and Decathlon are being considered to bring in weekend crowds. The area will be partly opened for public use and its accessibility will be greatly improved if plans for the Tuas South MRT Extension on the East West line come into fruition.

Integrated Train Testing Centre (ITTC) 
The first in Southeast Asia, the upcoming 50-hectare Integrated Train Testing Centre (ITTC) will be equipped to test the rail systems of Singapore 24/7, without causing any disruptions to regular passenger services. This will free up the already-limited engineering hours on the existing train lines for other crucial activities such as maintenance and renewal works. It will house an operations control centre, testing equipment, and test track for performance integration, and endurance and high speed testing for new trains and supporting systems. For major refurbishment of existing trains, the centre will also contain a rolling stock workshop, stabling tracks, and maintenance tracks.

The centre, located at the former Raffles Country Club in Tuas, will begin operations in phases, with the first phase to be completed by 2023 to receive new trains and test systems for the Circle line Stage 6. It is expected to be fully operational by 2025.

East Coast Integrated Depot 

In total, the depot will have a storage capacity of 220 trains and 760 buses. The building will be using a stacked approach, stacking three independently operated train depots above one another. The Downtown line depot will be located underground, followed by the Thomson-East Coast line depot on ground level and the East West line depot on the level above it. On the other hand, the adjacent three-storey bus depot will house workshops on the first level with the remaining two levels being parking bays. The integrated design will save  of land and S$2 billion as compared to constructing four separate depots.

The depot is scheduled to be completed by 2025.

Land Transport Master Plan 2040 (LTMP 2040) 
Announced on 25 May 2019, the Land Transport Master Plan 2040 (LTMP 2040) reveals the long-term plans to meet the transport needs of Singaporeans over the next two decades.

Two new stations will be added on the North South line. Brickland MRT station, to be located between Choa Chu Kang MRT station and Bukit Gombak MRT station, will serve residents living in the surrounding areas and the upcoming Tengah New Town. Sungei Kadut MRT station, to be located between Yew Tee MRT station and Kranji MRT station, will serve industries in the area as well as the upcoming Sungei Kadut Eco-District. Both stations are scheduled to be opened by the mid-2030s.

The Downtown line will be extended to the future Sungei Kadut MRT station. This will result in the terminus to be shifted from the current Bukit Panjang MRT station to Sungei Kadut MRT station. It will interchange with the North South line. The extension is scheduled to operational by the mid-2030s, when the Sungei Kadut MRT station is completed.

The Thomson-East Coast line will also be extended, with an additional MRT station serving the future Changi Airport Terminal 5. The current East West line branch from Tanah Merah MRT station to Changi Airport MRT station will also be converted and linked up as part of the Thomson-East Coast line extension. The extension is scheduled to be completed by 2040.

A new MRT line that is being proposed as part of the master plan is currently under study. If feasible, it will run between Woodlands and the future Greater Southern Waterfront, serving parts of Sembawang, Sengkang, Serangoon North, Whampoa, and Kallang along the way.

Other than the MRT network, more Transit Priority Corridors (TPC) and Integrated Transport Hubs (ITH) will be built to improve the bus network and its connectivity. Overall, the LTMP 2040 aims to ensure the land transport system of Singapore is more seamless and convenient, inclusive, safer, and cleaner.

Tampines Walking and Cycling Town 
After Ang Mo Kio, Tampines will be the second walking and cycling town in Singapore when works to improve the town's infrastructure are completed. The total length of cycling paths in Tampines will be three times more than the current length. Furthermore, footpaths will be widened and roads will be redesigned and rebuilt. The existing cycling paths in the town will also be widened, while existing bicycle crossings will have additional signs and markings. All of these aim to make walking and cycling within the town safer and more convenient. A cycling bridge over the Tampines Expressway (TPE) to connect Tampines and Pasir Ris, and a cycling underpass to connect Tampines and Simei are currently under study.

The entire project is scheduled to be completed by 2022.

Expansion of Sengkang Depot 
Situated above the North East MRT line's depot, the expansion will include a new train stabling area, a maintenance workshop, and three new traction power stations. Two reception tracks will also be built to shorten the train launching time.

Construction began in end-2022 and is scheduled to be completed by 2027.

Upgrading and Expansion of Changi Airport Terminal 2 
Currently closed partially for improvement works, Changi Airport Terminal 2 will be upgraded on a large-scale to handle up to 5 million more passengers a year. As part of the upgrading, two iconic flight information display flip boards will be decommissioned and replaced by digital screens. One of the boards has been retired and will be donated to the National Heritage Board (NHB) to become part of Singapore's National Collection.

The revamped Terminal 2 will feature more greenery and 15,500 square metres more space for both travellers and visitors. The layout of the departure hall will be reconfigured to make more space, with some of the gaps between the drop-off points and the check-in areas to be partially reclaimed to increase the floor area. There will also be more self-service check-in facilities, baggage belts, and F&B outlets such as a two-storey duplex F&B concept at the north end of the terminal's landside. To cater for more retail and dining offerings, commercial spaces within the departure transit hall will be increased, particularly the existing food street areas which will undergo refurbishment, providing a garden dining experience. Also, as part of the upgrading, the existing Orchid Garden at the departure transit area will make way for a new garden with more plant species. More lounge-like waiting areas will also be included in the arrival hall for passengers and visitors.

The project is scheduled to be carried out in phases and is expected to be completed by 2024.

Healthcare

SGH Campus Master Plan 
Unveiled on 5 February 2016, the 43-hectare Singapore General Hospital (SGH) Campus at Outram will be redeveloped and expanded over the next two decades. Patient care facilities will take up 60% of the land, with the remaining 40% dedicated to research and education purposes anchored by the Duke-NUS Medical School and a new Research Park. The master plan will be carried out in two phases. Phase 1 includes new developments such as the already-completed Outram Community Hospital, SGH Accident & Emergency Block, SGH Elective Care Centre, a new National Dental Centre Singapore (NDCS), and a new National Cancer Centre Singapore (NCCS). After the completion of Phase 1, Phase 2 will begin with the development of an entirely new SGH complex.

The road network within the campus will also be improved and extended with increased road capacity to provide better connectivity between the developments. Pedestrian and vehicular traffic will be separated to allow faster access for ambulances and patients while easing congestion on the campus. To improve accessibility and convenience for patients and visitors, facilities with high patient volume such as the new NDCS and NCCS and the new SGH complex will be relocated closer to Outram Park MRT Station.

Health City Novena 
Unveiled on 30 August 2013, the  Health City Novena is an upcoming integrated healthcare complex that will physically link up 10 buildings including, the Tan Tock Seng Hospital (TTSH), a medical school, and public and volunteer healthcare facilities in the area. The master plan includes an Ambulatory Centre at TTSH, the already-completed National Centre for Infectious Disease (NCID), an expanded National Skin Centre and National Healthcare Group headquarters, and a new Integrated Intermediate Care Hub (IICH) comprising Dover Park Hospice and a community hospital that will be connected to TTSH and Ren Ci Hospital for seamless patient transfers.

Other than offering a full range of holistic care experiences, Health City Novena will also encompass health services, research and education, commercial, leisure, and public spaces.

The entire development is expected to be completed by 2030.

Woodlands Health Campus 
Broken-ground on 18 April 2017, the  Woodlands Health Campus is an upcoming 1,800-bed healthcare facility in Woodlands to be managed by the National Healthcare Group. It will house an acute hospital, a community hospital, a nursing home, and specialist outpatient clinics. The acute and community hospitals will be housed in the same building, a first in Singapore, to share medical professionals and seamlessly transfer patients between the two hospitals. The specialist outpatient clinics will be housed in a separate block, connected to the main building via a link bridge. The nursing home, together with a senior care centre, will be operated by Ren Ci Hospital.

The campus will be utilising smart technology such as data analytics and artificial intelligence to improve patient care and reduce manual work. Robots will also be used to automate back-of-house operations.

Vast green spaces will also be included within the campus, such as a  Healing Forest Garden which offers open spaces, plots for community gardening, and quiet areas. The garden is Singapore's first parkland that is purpose-built for patient healing. There will also be Therapeutic Gardens in between the healthcare blocks.

The campus, within walking distance to Woodlands South MRT station, is expected to be completed and opened in phases from 2022.

Serangoon Polyclinic 
Announced on 8 December 2019, Serangoon Polyclinic is an upcoming polyclinic located opposite NEX Shopping Mall in Serangoon. It will be part of an integrated healthcare facility that will also house an active ageing hub and a kidney dialysis centre. The polyclinic will be providing similar services offered at other polyclinics nationwide.

When completed by 2025, Serangoon Polyclinic will be the largest polyclinic in Singapore by floor area.

Redevelopment of Alexandra Hospital 
The redevelopment will allow for greater accessibility from Queensway, and house more spaces for trials on new care models. It will also place focus on preserving the hospital's history and heritage, where conserved Blocks 1, 2, and 6 will be retained.

The first phase of redevelopment is estimated to be completed by 2030.

Refurbishment of Mount Elizabeth Hospital 
Named "Project Renaissance", the refurbishment of Mount Elizabeth Hospital at Orchard will cost approximately S$350 million and take three years to complete. The project will see a new drop-off area and hospital lobby, upgrades to the hospital's equipment and existing technology, and an expansion to the emergency department and treatment centres.

The refurbishment works will be carried out in phases with certain services being temporarily relocated to minimise disruptions.

New integrated hospital in Bedok North 
Announced on 5 March 2020, there will be a new integrated hospital in the east of Singapore to ease the load on the existing Changi General Hospital (CGH) - currently the only hospital in the east. The new hospital will be Singapore's 12th public general hospital and is to be managed by SingHealth. The general hospital will provide emergency services alongside inpatient and specialist outpatient services, while the community hospital will provide intermediate services such as rehabilitation to support patients who are discharged from the general hospital.

Scheduled to be operational by 2030, the integrated hospital will be located next to Bedok North MRT station.

Proposed dementia care village 
Announced on 16 July 2019, Singapore will be building its first dementia care village to care for dementia patients and improve their quality of life and residential options available to them. The special village will be built on a site in Gibraltar Crescent near Sembawang Park. The site houses 10 cluster bungalows, which are to be remained, across two land plots. Other than providing a safe, home-like environment, the village will also offer customised services and programmes to foster meaningful and active interaction among its residents.

On 19 May 2020, the Urban Redevelopment Authority (URA) has rejected the sole tender of the site as the bid of S$15 million was deemed to be too low.

Education

Singapore Institute of Technology (SIT) Punggol Campus 
Part of the upcoming Punggol Digital District (PDD), the currently-under-construction Singapore Institute of Technology (SIT) campus in Punggol will consolidate all degree programmes offered by the university under one campus. Currently, the university is located in a main campus at Dover and five satellite campuses in polytechnics across the island. The new 91,000 square-metre centralised campus in Punggol will have a capacity of up to 12,000 students.

The campus will be co-located with the new JTC business park to foster greater student-industry collaboration. SIT and JTC have exchanged 8,000 square metres of space, allowing industry partners to operate within the SIT campus, and student attending classes in the JTC buildings. Buildings of both developments will be linked by a Collaboration Loop.

Aside from auditoriums and indoor sports facilities, two 10-storey academic blocks will house classrooms, laboratories, and group learning spaces linked by an elevated canopy walk. An 11-storey Admin Block will house approximately 2,200 administrative staff and faculty, while another 10-storey building, named the Learning Hub, will be fitted with a solar panel roof, where energy generated will be transferred into the grid which integrates gas, electricity, and thermal energy into a unified smart energy network. The entire development will be the first university in South-east Asia to have a multi-energy micro grid network that draws energy from various sources.

The ground level spaces of the campus will also accessible to the general public. Aside from a market village and a foodcourt facing the waterfront,  of an existing forest along Punggol Road will be conserved to create a forest courtyard, giving the campus a distinctive 'campus-in-a-park' identity. The existing Punggol Road will also be transformed into a 1.3 km heritage trail, running through the campus and to the waterfront.

The campus, estimated to cost more than S$1 billion, is now expected to be completed by 2024.

Ngee Ann Kongsi Building (Expansion of LASALLE College of the Arts) 
A new S$50 million, 20,000 square-metre 12-storey block, directly connected to Rochor MRT station, will be built on a  site adjacent to the existing LASALLE College of the Arts McNally Street campus to centralise the school's facilities. With the expansion, students will not need to travel to different campuses for classes. The expansion will include new facilities such as a 300-seat lecture theatre, a music recital hall, a film studio, and new public galleries. The new building, to be built with the S$50 million donation from Ngee Ann Kongsi, will also feature a glass facade that opens out to Rochor Canal Road.

Construction will begin from 2021 and is expected to be completed by 2025.

Attractions

Mandai Nature Project
Currently under construction outside the Nature Reserves, the  Mandai Nature Precinct will be majorly rejuvenated. Jurong Bird Park will be relocated from its current site at Jurong and rejuvenated in the new precinct with a new name - Bird Paradise, as well as an addition of a new park named Rainforest Wild.

When fully completed, the precinct will be home to the Singapore Zoo, Night Safari, River Wonders, Bird Paradise, and Rainforest Wild.

The new 17-hectare Bird Paradise will allow visitors to observe free-flying birds in their natural habitats at the nine new aviaries themed with different landscapes from around the world, such as wetlands, bamboo forests, and rainforests. It will also house a breeding and research facility to increase the populations of endangered species. It is scheduled to open in Q2
2023.

The new 12.5-hectare Rainforest Wild, which aspires to be an authentic representation of a rainforest, will allow visitors to go on aerial walkways that extend from the forest floor to the treetop canopies, or relax in the cool forest in suspended pods.

Home-grown hospitality group, Banyan Tree, has been appointed to develop and operate the eco-resort, which will be built on a  site currently housing the Singapore Zoo's back-of-house facilities. The 338-room resort will provide guests with an "immersive stay close to nature" and an "unprecedented access" to nature during their stay. Other than standard and family rooms, the resort will also offer elevated cabins and treehouses. Guests will also be able to go on guided nature walks, native wildlife spotting tours, and workshops. The resort will adopt an environmentally design and construction, and operate along sustainable principles. When completed, the resort will be Singapore's first Super Low Energy resort.

Two arrival nodes, namely West Arrival Node and East Arrival Node, will also be constructed to welcome visitors into the entire precinct. The West Arrival Node will include a breath-taking view of a waterfall set amidst a "luxuriantly-landscaped" cavern. It will also feature a landscaped deck to connect visitors between the two new wildlife parks. The East Arrival Node, which is envisioned as a forest courtyard, will feature a synergy of nature and architecture. It will serve as the arrival and entry point for the existing three attractions, a nature-themed indoor attraction and the Banyan Tree resort. The East Arrival Node will also house a basement transportation hub, creating a vehicle-free environment at surface level for public performances and events.

Public spaces with no admission charges, such as nature trails, boardwalks, outdoor seating, and playgrounds will also be added.

On 13 October 2021, Mandai Wildlife Group introduced a rebranding of the five parks, unveiling new logos and the renaming of River Safari and Jurong Bird Park to River Wonders and Bird Paradise, respectively.

The 5-in-1 eco-tourism hub is scheduled to be fully completed in an environmentally-sustainable and sensitive manner by 2024.

Expansion of Integrated Resorts
Announced on 3 April 2019, the Marina Bay Sands (MBS) and Resorts World Sentosa (RWS) will be expanded, with the plans costing S$9 billion.

Marina Bay Sands (MBS) 
The MBS will build a new 15,000-seat indoor entertainment arena, as well as a fourth tower containing about 1,000 hotel rooms, a sky roof with a swimming pool and a "signature restaurant". New ballrooms, exhibition halls will be built with food and beverage options to expand. The tower will be located next to the existing development.

The timeline for the completion of the expansion has not been announced. However, due to the COVID-19 pandemic, the expansion has been announced that it would be likely delayed.

Resorts World Sentosa (RWS) 
The RWS will have two new attractions, Minion Land and Super Nintendo World, at Universal Studios Singapore. The existing S.E.A. Aquarium will expand thrice its current size and be rebranded as the Singapore Oceanarium.

In addition, RWS will also add two new hotels with a total capacity of 1,100 rooms and a future lifestyle complex at the waterfront. The waterfront promenade will be revamped to include new night shows and an event zone, with a new Adventure Dining Playhouse to replace the existing Resorts World Theatre. A driverless system will also be built across the Sentosa Boardwalk for better connectivity.

RWS's new attractions will open in phases, yearly from 2020, and expected to be fully completed by 2025. However, due to the COVID-19 pandemic, the expansion has been announced that it will be delayed due to disruptions in the global supply chain. A re-design to the expansion will also be carried out to ensure adaptability to the post COVID-19 environment.

On 26 May 2022, work for the new Minion Land at Universal Studios Singapore began with a groundbreaking ceremony. The expansion is expected to be operationally-ready in 2024. It will house multiple rides including the motion-simulator 3D ride - Despicable Me Minion Mayhem, and a ride that will be the first of its kind in the world and exclusive to Universal Studios Singapore.

Additional Gaming Provisions and Casino Levies/Taxes Increase 
MBS and RWS, should they decide to expand gaming facilities, will be allowed space of 2,000 square metres and 500 square metres respectively adding to the current 15,000 sq m each, with 1,000 and 800 new machines respectively on top of the 2,500 each. This will still lead to a drop in approved gaming areas from 3.1 percent to 2.3 percent given the increase in non-gaming areas.

As a result of these changes, the exclusivity period of the IRs will be extended to end-2030, with casino levies for Singaporeans and PRs increasing to S$150 daily and S$3,000 annually, taking effect on 4 April 2019. From August 2019, a second daily or annual casino entry levy can only be purchased if the current levy expires within six hours, taking effect after six hours of purchase.

From March 2022, casino tax rates will also increase from the current 5 percent and 15 percent for premium and mass gaming, respectively, to a two-tier tax rates of 8 percent and 12 percent (premium) and 18 percent and 22 percent (mass) based on the total gross gaming revenue earned. A flat tax rate of 22 percent (mass) and 12 per cent (premium) will be imposed should the IRs' investment commitments fail. The tax rates will remain unchanged for 10 years.

Sentosa-Brani Master Plan
Sentosa and Pulau Brani will be transformed under the Sentosa-Brani Master Plan. First proposed in 2018, the plans will span the next two to three decades, with both islands divided into five zones. "Vibrant Cluster", will have large-scale attractions spanning both islands, while "Island Heart" will feature hotels, commercial and conference spaces. "Waterfront" will have a Discovery Park situated in Pulau Brani, while "Ridgeline" will connect green spaces from Mount Faber to Mount imbiah, featuring nature and heritage attractions. "Beachfront" will have a water show, fairgrounds and other attractions to rejuvenate Sentosa's beaches. Transportation will be enhanced too.

In addition, a future "Downtown South" resort, similar to the current NTUC Downtown East in Pasir Ris, will be located on Pulau Brani once the port moves out in 2027. A suitable location is still being worked out with the National Trades Union Congress.

The first project to be built will be the S$90 million Sentosa Sensoryscape, a themed two-tiered thoroughfare connecting Resorts World Sentosa and the southern beaches, replacing the current linkway. It will have look-out points, water features and other architectural elements, thereby creating a multi-sensory experience. When completed by end 2023, the Sentosa Sensoryscape will double the current linkway capacity, being as large as 5 football fields. As a result, the Sentosa Merlion will be demolished from year-end, with its last day of operations on 20 October 2019. The four shops around Sentosa Merlion started closing from the next day onwards.

The current Police Coast Guard headquarters on Pulau Brani will stay put.

Kallang Alive Master Plan 
Announced by Sport Singapore (SportSG) on 6 August 2019, the area around Kallang and the Singapore Sports Hub is set to be further enhanced as a destination for sport and world-class entertainment and inject vibrancy into the area while complementing the already-completed Singapore Sports Hub. There will be a total of six developments with the entire project set to be completed by 2025.

Included in the plan is Singapore's first velodrome to cater to the community and serve as the national training centre for track cycling. The velodrome will be part of the Youth Hub which include spaces for non-traditional sports such as speed climbing and parkour.

Built on the former Kallang baseball/softball field, the Kallang Football Hub will house the national training centre and ActiveSG Football Academy. The facility consists of a full-sized natural turf pitch, two full-sized artificial pitches, and a half-sized pitch. Four sheltered futsal pitches and a perimeter running track will also be part of the facility.

Replacing one of the outdoor carparks near the Kallang Leisure Park, the new tennis facility, Singapore Tennis Centre, will consist of open and sheltered courts and similarly function as the national training centre and ActiveSG Academy. The new facility will replace the current centre and will be opened to the public.

The Kallang Theatre and its surrounding areas will be redeveloped into an integrated sport, entertainment, and lifestyle centre. Some proposed ideas include office spaces, a multi-purpose e-sports arena, a themed hotel, and an international sports medicine centre.

A circular walking and cycling loop named Alive Gateway and Loop will also be built to trace the original Kallang Airport airfield and link to the waterfront. This would reintegrate the old Kallang Airport site with the overall precinct.

Benaan Kapal Green, an active community park space, will be introduced along the waterfront and includes park connectors, running trails, and play areas for the public.

However, with the development of the master plan, current spaces for sports such as archery, cricket, softball, baseball, netball, and squash will have to be vacated to make way for the development, with most already left the premises.

NS Square 
First announced in 2017 and a reveal of the artist's impressions and further details on 9 August 2020, the NS Square is set to replace the existing Marina Bay floating platform (The Float @ Marina Bay) and is envisioned to be the central focus of the new downtown area. The development will be aligned on a central axis, with The Promontory on the opposite side of the bay, offering a panoramic view of the city skyline.

Like its predecessor, the NS Square will continue to host future National Day Parades, as well as a new addition of a permanent gallery dedicated to national servicemen (NSmen) and honour their past and present contributions. The NS Square will be a permanent space for large-scale national events and has a seating capacity of 30,000. It will also include community sports facilities, such as a swimming pool and water sports centre, as well as a waterfront promenade with F&B and retail outlets that will improve pedestrian connectivity.

If the Singapore Grand Prix is extended beyond 2021, the temporary closure of the floating platform for construction works of the NS Square will affect the race's Bay Grandstand. A realignment to the Marina Bay Street Circuit, particularly the 300-metre stretch from Turns 16 to 19 along the floating platform, will also have to be carried out. This will be the first major adjustment to the circuit since 2008.

The project is scheduled to begin in March 2023 and expected to be completed by end-2026.

Founders' Memorial 

To begin construction in 2022 in a  waterfront site at Gardens by the Bay's Bay East Garden, the Founders' Memorial is scheduled to be completed in 2027 to honour the pioneer leaders of Singapore. The building will feature clean architecture lines and a flowing linear green terrain, with lush greenery and foliage, that leads visitors to an amphitheatre that is suitable for large-scale gatherings. The waterfront site will offer visitors a clear view of the Singapore skyline. Other than the amphitheatre, the building will also feature a viewing gallery, permanent and temporary galleries, a visitor centre, multi-purpose rooms, a lake, and a forest trail.

The Founders' Memorial will be served by the future Founders' Memorial MRT station on the Thomson-East Coast line, which will be opened in tandem with the development.

The Bus Resort 
Located next to the Changi Village Hawker Centre, The Bus Resort is an upcoming resort development by WTS Travel. Featuring twenty decommissioned public buses revamped as well-furnished resort rooms, the resort is set to open in 2023.

New Science Centre Singapore 
Designed by Zaha Hadid Architects, the new Science Centre Singapore will be larger than the current centre to house more gallery spaces for thematic exhibitions and enhanced educational facilities such as specialised laboratories for visitors to conduct hands-on experiments and create new inventions. It will also have more outdoor programmes for visitors to explore the interaction between nature and science. The centre will also have a maker space for organisations to test their prototypes or for creators to use a 3D-printer.

The new centre, set to be completed by 2025, will be located at a waterfront site next to Chinese Garden MRT station. The existing centre will continue to operate until around 2025, before being repurposed for other uses.

Expansion of Singapore Art Museum (SAM) 
Currently closed for renovation works, the S$90 million revamp of the Singapore Arts Museum (SAM) will be completed in 2026. A 1,200 square-metre "floating" sky gallery with column-free spaces is part of the expansion plans. A double-volume atrium entryway and outdoor plaza will also be built to welcome visitors arriving from the Bras Basah MRT station. Furthermore, a new gallery-cum-bridge will be constructed to offer a seamless connection and museum experience between the old St Joseph's Institution and former Catholic High School buildings, which are also occupied by SAM. The existing driveway at the Bras Basah entrance will also be converted into a lawn for pedestrians. Due to the expansion, a new facade featuring reflective glass panels angled towards and reflecting the existing dome of the original heritage main building will be seen from Bras Basah Road.

In total, the expansion will add 30 percent more exhibition space to the property.

Children's Museum Singapore (Redevelopment of Singapore Philatelic Museum) 
Currently closed for redevelopment works, the Singapore Philatelic Museum will become a dedicated children's museum. Different from most museums in the country, the revamped Singapore Philatelic Museum will encourage visitors to explore and learn through artefacts, hands-on and immersive displays, personal stories, and role-playing. Visitors will be able to explore a wide range of themes including heritage, culture, and contemporary issues in Singapore and the surrounding region.

The existing stamp collection will continue to be displayed alongside other artefacts to support children's learning.

Closed since 18 March 2019, the redeveloped Singapore Philatelic Museum will be reopened in end-2022.

Proposed New Attraction in Jurong Lake District
On 16 April 2019, the Singapore Tourism Board announced a new 7-hectare integrated tourism development in Jurong Lake District, which will be built by 2026. The development will feature a hotel, attractions, eateries and shops and will be located near to the new Science Centre Singapore and the Chinese Garden MRT station. A request for proposal was launched by STB on 15 March 2022, with the development now expected by 2028. The companies successful in the tender will get a 60-year lease for the site, which will require an emphasis on technology, edutainment and sustainability concepts.

Proposed Suspended LED Sky Screen 
Announced on 29 June 2022 by The Place Holdings, Singapore is set to be home to Southeast Asia's largest suspended LED interactive sky screen when completed. Designed after the Shimao Tianjie Sky Screen in Beijing, the 200-metre screen is expected to be constructed within one and a half years at an undisclosed location and is capable of broadcasting live events such as concerts.

Community/Leisure

Bukit Canberra 
The  Bukit Canberra is an upcoming integrated sports and community hub next to Sembawang MRT station. The hub will house facilities including an indoor sports hall, the largest ActiveSG gym in Singapore, a six-lane sheltered swimming pool, and an eight-lane lap pool. There will also be 3 km of running trails, of various difficulties, passing throughout the development. A polyclinic, a senior care centre, and a hawker centre will also be housed in the hub.

A forest buffer around the external boundary of the hub will be conserved and planted up into a tropical secondary rainforest. The surrounding park will also feature a "food forest" and "fruit orchard", with edible crops. There will also be community gardens for nearby residents. Heritage story boards will be placed around the park for visitors to learn more about the area's past as a naval base. The former Admiralty House will also be restored as part of the plans.

Bukit Canberra will be the second such community hub in Singapore, after Our Tampines Hub in Tampines. It will open in phases, with the entire development expected to be fully operational by September 2021.

Punggol Regional Sports Centre 
Adjacent to the upcoming Punggol Town Hub, the Punggol Regional Sports Centre will feature a 5,000-seater football stadium, a swimming complex with five pools, an indoor sports hall with 20 badminton courts, and a team sports hall with three convertible basketball courts. Aside from these facilities, the centre will also include a gym, a fitness studio, sheltered tennis and futsal courts, a water activity centre, and an archery training centre. The centre will be catered to a wide range of competitive sporting events and will be integrated with the Punggol Waterway and co-located with the existing SAFRA Punggol clubhouse.

The centre is expected to be ready by 2023.

Bay East Garden 

The new garden will house the Founders' Memorial, which is currently under construction. It will be split into two themed zones, one inspired by the past and the other by the future. The past zone will feature native and naturalised plant species, and heritage trees such as the tembusu tree that was commonly planted in the past. On the other hand, the future zone will feature a wetland where greenery is integrated with the urban landscape.

A bridge connecting Bay South Garden and Bay East Garden is currently being studied. A tender for its design will be called by the end of 2022.

Bay East Garden is expected to be completed in 2027, alongside the new Founders' Memorial.

Bukit Timah-Rochor Green Corridor 
An 11 km elevated green link running above and parallel to the Bukit Timah Canal, the Bukit Timah-Rochor Green Corridor will provide visitors a seamless connection between Jurong Lake Gardens, Singapore Botanic Gardens, and Gardens by the Bay. New trees will be planted on both sides of the link to create a "riverine rainforest experience" while providing shade for those using the link.

Construction of the first phase is scheduled to begin in 2021, and is estimated to be completed within two to three years time.

Sungei Buloh Nature Park Network 
Announced on 19 August 2020, the upcoming Sungei Buloh Nature Park Network will become Singapore's second nature park network when completed.

The  Mandai Mangrove and Mudflat, formerly out of bounds to the public, will be refurbished with basic amenities such as a nature trail, bicycle racks, and bird hides for public access.

The  Lim Chu Kang Nature Park, formerly the Western Extension, will be linked up with the Lim Chu Kang mangroves and feature outdoor play areas. The 100-year-old Cashin House at the edge of the shore will also be reconstructed for educational purposes with new facilities such as an exhibition space, seminar rooms, and a seaview terrace. The adjoining pier will also be refurbished.

The entire network, boasting more than 15 km of nature trails, is expected to be opened by 2022 and will be connected to the Round-Island-Route.

Refurbishment of Registries of Civil and Muslim Marriages Building 
Announced on 11 March 2019, the 36-year-old Registries of Civil and Muslim Marriages (ROM and ROMM) building at Fort Canning will have its interior refurbished and modernised. Some of the proposed design concepts include the use of natural lighting in the solemnisation rooms, overhauling the waiting area with a central garden and additional smaller "intimate" waiting spaces, and installing interactive panels to educate to-be couples with relevant information on issues such as the Build-to-Order (BTO) flat application.

The refurbishment works are expected to be completed in 2022.

Upgrading of Marine Parade Community Building 

Closed in June 2022, the existing Marine Parade Community Building will be demolished and redeveloped into a new community building. Despite calls for conservation, the building's iconic mural art wall facade is set to be removed as part of the upgrading works. Measuring 63 metres in width and 12 metres in height, the mosaic facade is Singapore's largest installation art piece.

Revamp of *SCAPE 
Announced on 27 July 2022, *SCAPE at Orchard Road will be undergoing a revamp to attract youths of all ages where it will be reconfigured to house three key zones for further collaborations between young entrepreneurs, creatives, and content creators. Aside from infrastructure changes to make the building more accessible, a new tenant mix will also be introduced as part of the revamp.

The revamp is expected to begin in early 2023 and completed in early 2024.

Military/Security

Tengah Airbase

Paya Lebar Airbase is bound to be retired and freed up for commercial or residential use by 2030. As such, the aircraft will be moved to the newly expanded Tengah Airbase, which has already begun construction. The land surrounding the area has been recently acquired by the government, including cemeteries, graves and agricultural farms in the nearby area. More training areas and a second runway will be built.

National Service (NS) Hub 
Officially ground-broken on 25 November 2019, the NS Hub, which occupies a land area of approximately nine hectares, will house the Central Manpower Base (CMPB), Military Medicine Institute (MMI), and a new Fitness Conditioning Centre to meet all the services that pre-enlistees and Operationally Ready National Servicemen (NSmen) need. The hub will also include an e-Mart for NSmen to stock up on their necessary NS equipment such as combat boots and admin t-shirts.

Currently, pre-enlistees attend medical screenings at the CMPB located at Depot Road, and the MMI located at Kent Ridge for other specialist medical services. As for NSmen, they currently take their IPPT at various locations. However, with the NS Hub, national servicemen will not need to report to various locations across Singapore for different NS services.

The NS Hub will also be utilising technology such as facial recognition, automation, and analytics to improve visitor experience.

Other than NSmen, the public will also be able to use the facilities at the NS Hub. Some of the facilities include a food court, a childcare center, and an outdoor community area with a running track and football field. The hub will also house the radio stations of Power 98 Love Songs and 88.3JIA for visitors to catch the DJs live on air. Studios will also be built for the public to enjoy performances.

Set to be completed by 2023, the NS Hub will be directly accessible via an overhead bridge from Cashew MRT station along Upper Bukit Timah Road.

Expansion of Woodlands Checkpoint 
First announced on 30 March 2017 by the Immigration and Checkpoints Authority (ICA), the current Woodlands Checkpoint will be expanded with the addition of a new wing to be built at the site of the Old Woodlands Town Centre, adjacent to the checkpoint. The approximately 8-hectare site will help to boost clearance capacity and meet growing cross-border traffic needs.

While demolition works are being carried out at the site, the ICA is currently conducting a feasibility study to determine the optimal design of the expansion and the extent of the upgrading and redevelopment works. However, the ICA did not state if the new wing will be meant for vehicular or human traffic, nor state the completion date of the expansion.

On 26 May 2022, the ICA announced that the expansion will include areas aside from the Old Woodands Town Centre. This updated plan will involve the acquisition of nine Housing and Development Board (HDB) blocks located adjacent to the existing checkpoint by the second quarter of 2028. Apart from the added capacity, the expansion will also see "flexi-lanes" that are equipped to clear cars and motorcycles, thereby reducing clearance time. To support the expanded checkpoint, surrounding roads and the existing Bukit Timah Expressway will be extended and upgraded to funnel traffic directly to and from the new extension.

Integrated Services Centre (Expansion of ICA Building) 
Announced on 10 December 2019 by the Immigration and Checkpoints Authority (ICA), the carpark next to the current ICA Building at Lavender will be replaced by a new 10-storey 24-hour Integrated Services Centre. The centre will be making use of technology, such as self-service kiosks with bio-metric technology, to shorten the process of document pick-ups. Other than providing a convenient one-stop centre offering public services, the new centre will also house a number of service centres, a heritage centre, the Registrar of Societies, and the Casino Regulatory Authority. The current building will also be upgraded with total works estimated to cost S$300 million.

This new facility will more than double the size of the current headquarters and is expected to be operational by 2023.

See also
 Urban renewal in Singapore
 Marina Bay
 Downtown Core
 List of tallest buildings in Singapore

References

External links
 Urban Redevelopment Authority official website

Architecture in Singapore
Proposed populated places
Proposed infrastructure in Singapore
Lists of proposals